Marcus Ardel Taulauniu Mariota (born October 30, 1993) is an American football quarterback who is a free agent. He was drafted second overall by the Tennessee Titans in the 2015 NFL Draft. Mariota played college football at Oregon, where he was the starting quarterback from 2012 to 2014. As a junior in 2014, Mariota became the first University of Oregon player, as well as the first Hawaii-born athlete, to win the Heisman Trophy.

Beginning with his second season as starting quarterback for the Titans, who had only won five games in the previous two seasons, Mariota led the team to three consecutive winning seasons, the most since the team was known as the Houston Oilers. He was benched and replaced by Ryan Tannehill as starting quarterback halfway through the 2019 season, who the team had traded for earlier that offseason. Mariota signed with the Las Vegas Raiders the following season and backed up Derek Carr before signing with the Falcons in 2022.

Early life
Mariota was born in Honolulu, Hawaii, on October 30, 1993, to Alana Deppe-Mariota and Toa Mariota. He is of Samoan descent on his father's side and German descent on his mother's side. He grew up admiring the quarterback play of fellow Samoan Jeremiah Masoli, who was also a standout quarterback at the Saint Louis School and the University of Oregon. Mariota describes himself as a dedicated Christian. Mariota has a younger brother Matt who also plays football.

Mariota attended the Saint Louis School in Honolulu, where he was a two-sport star in football and track. In football, he was relatively unknown until late in his high school career due to not starting until his senior season. As a senior, he helped lead St. Louis to an 11–1 record and the state title while being named PrepStar Magazine All-West Region and Interscholastic League of Honolulu Offensive Player of the Year. Mariota threw for 2,597 yards on 165-of-225 passing attempts (64.7%), including 32 touchdowns against only five interceptions. He also rushed the ball 60 times for 455 yards (7.6 yards per carry) and seven touchdowns. Mariota was named to the NUC All World Game alongside eventual 2012 Heisman Trophy winner Johnny Manziel.

Also a standout track and field athlete, Mariota was a state track qualifier in the sprinting and jumping events. At the 2010 National Underclassman Combine, he won the camp's "Fastest Man" and "Combine King" awards after running a 4.48-second 40-yard dash. At the 2011 HHSAA T&F Championships, he earned fourth-place finishes in both the 200-meter dash (23.41 s) and the long jump (20 ft, 7 in), while also placing tenth in the 100-meter dash event at 11.63 seconds. He also ran the second leg on the St. Louis 4 × 100 m relay squad, helping them capture the state title with a time of 42.83 seconds.

High school awards and honors
 2010 HHSAA Division 1 State Football Championship
 2010 Interscholastic League of Honolulu Offensive Player of the Year
 2010 PrepStar Magazine All-West Region
 2010 Hawaii Gatorade Player of the Year

Recruitment
Mariota attended an Oregon football camp in the summer of 2010, which allowed Mark Helfrich, Oregon's then offensive coordinator, to be one of the first recruiters to discover Mariota. After the camp, Helfrich visited Mariota in Hawaii to watch the somewhat unrecognized quarterback practice going into his senior season. Helfrich called Chip Kelly during the visit and they made the decision to immediately offer Mariota a scholarship, despite never starting a varsity game.

After his senior season, he was rated the No. 2 recruiting prospect in the state of Hawaii and No. 12 dual-threat quarterback in the nation by Rivals.com. He was recruited by the Oregon Ducks, Hawaii, Memphis, Utah, Oregon State, Washington, Arizona, Notre Dame, UCLA, and USC but was only offered a scholarship by Memphis and Oregon.

College career

2012 season

After redshirting the 2011 season, Mariota was showcased in 2012 as the first freshman to start a season opener for the Ducks in 22 seasons. He helped lead Oregon to a 12–1 record and the No. 2 final season ranking while being named Pac-12 All-Conference 1st Team, Pac-12 Freshman Offensive Player of the Year, and earning the 2013 Fiesta Bowl Offensive MVP Award as he guided the Ducks to a 35–17 victory over #5 Kansas State.

Starting in all 13 games, Mariota threw for 2,677 yards on 230-of-336 passing attempts (68.5%), including 32 touchdowns against only six interceptions. He also rushed the ball 106 times for 752 yards (7.1 yards per carry) and five touchdowns. His athletic versatility was exhibited against Arizona State, when he caught a touchdown pass, threw a touchdown pass, and then ran for an 86-yard touchdown, achieving all three scores with 12 minutes still left in first half.

2013 season
Mariota earned Pac-12 All-Conference 1st Team honors for the second consecutive year after setting a Pac-12 record from the end of the 2012 season into the 2013 season by attempting 353 passes without an interception. Starting in all 13 games, he completed 245-of-386 passing attempts (63.5%) for 3,665 yards with 31 touchdowns and only four interceptions, while rushing for 715 yards (7.4 yards per carry) and nine touchdowns.

Mariota suffered a partial tear of the MCL against UCLA on October 26 but continued to play the remainder of the season. After Oregon's 8–0 start, Mariota was featured on the national cover of the November 4, 2013 issue of Sports Illustrated as the favorite to win the Heisman Trophy before the No. 2 ranked Ducks fell to No. 6 Stanford on November 7. Despite Oregon's 11–2 season record and top-ten ranking, Mariota's sophomore season was considered a letdown after the Ducks failed to reach a BCS bowl berth for the first time since the 2008 season.

After a loss to Arizona on November 23, Oregon's first loss to an unranked opponent since 2008, Mariota and the Ducks bounced back to beat rival Oregon State 36–35 in the Civil War. Mariota threw a touchdown pass to Josh Huff with 29 seconds remaining to give Oregon the come-from-behind victory over the Beavers.

Mariota guided the Ducks to their third consecutive bowl victory, beating Texas 30–7 in the 2013 Alamo Bowl while being honored as the game's Offensive MVP after rushing for 133 yards on 15 carries and finishing with 386 total yards. He finished the 2013 season with 4,380 yards of total offense, becoming the only player in Oregon history to eclipse 4,000 yards in a season.

2014 season

Prior to the Alamo Bowl on December 30, 2013, Mariota announced his decision to bypass the NFL Draft and return for the 2014 season. Considered by many to be a Heisman Trophy favorite entering the 2014 season, Mariota was named to watch lists for the Maxwell Award, Walter Camp Award, and Davey O'Brien Award. Prior to the start of the 2014 season, Mariota was considered one of the best prospects for the NFL Draft.

On December 11, 2014, at the annual College Football Awards show in Orlando, Florida, Mariota won the Davey O'Brien Award for the nation's best quarterback, and the Walter Camp and Maxwell Awards, both awarded to the nation's best football player. The next day back in Eugene, Mariota graduated from the University of Oregon with a bachelor's degree in General Sciences, with an emphasis on human physiology, accomplishing one of his goals in returning to play after the 2013 season.

On December 13, 2014, Mariota became the first Oregon Duck and Hawaii-born athlete to win the Heisman Trophy. He had 788 out of 891 (88.4%) of the first place votes, and 90.9% of the total points.

After a 12–1 regular season record, the Ducks were selected to play in the 2015 Rose Bowl, a semi-final game in the College Football Playoff, against Florida State and Jameis Winston. Mariota was named the Offensive MVP in the 59–20 victory, after throwing for 338 yards with two passing touchdowns and rushing for 62 yards with one touchdown. With the win, Oregon faced Ohio State in the National Championship and lost by a score of 42–20. Coming into this game, he was set to clinch the All-Time lowest interception record, until the final 27 seconds where the last pass of the game was intercepted by cornerback Eli Apple. The loss to the Buckeyes was Mariota's final collegiate game as he entered the 2015 NFL Draft a few days later.

In 2016, Oregon unveiled their 30,000 square-foot Marcus Mariota Sports Performance Center.

In 2020, the university conducted a poll of alumni and fans via social media, asking them to select four Oregon alumni for a notional Mount Rushmore for the university. Mariota was one of the top four selections, alongside Nike cofounder and university benefactor Phil Knight, Ducks track legend Steve Prefontaine, and recently graduated basketball superstar Sabrina Ionescu.

College statistics

 1 – NCAA Leader
 2 – Pac-12 Leader
 3 – NCAA Leader (QB)
 4 – Pac-12 Leader (QB)

Awards and honors

2012
 Pac-12 Offensive Freshman of the Year
 Pac-12 All-Conference 1st Team (Pac-12 Coaches, ESPN.com, Phil Steele)
 Pac-12 Academic All-Conference Honorable Mention
 Honorable Mention All-America (SI.com)
 Manning Award Finalist
 Team's Most Outstanding Player (Skeie's Award)
 Fiesta Bowl Offensive MVP (January 3, 2013)

2013
 Pac-12 All-Conference 1st Team (Pac-12 Coaches, Phil Steele)
 Sports Illustrated Cover, August 19
 Pac-12 Offensive Player of the Week (Pac-12 Coaches) October 7
 Walter Camp National Offensive Player of the Week, October 13
 Pac-12 Offensive Player of the Week (Pac-12 Coaches) October 14
 Sports Illustrated Cover, November 4
 Team's Most Outstanding Player (Skeie's Award)
 Team's Most Inspirational Player (Wilford Gonyea Award)
 Alamo Bowl Offensive MVP
 CFPA Quarterback Trophy Winner

2014

 Athlon Sports National Player of the Week September 7
 Walter Camp National Offensive Player of the Week September 7
 Pac-12 Offensive Player of the Week (Pac-12 Coaches) September 8
 Davey O'Brien Quarterback of the Week September 9
 Sports Illustrated Cover, September 22
 Senior Bowl National Offensive Player of the Week October 20
 Pac-12 Offensive Player of the Week (Pac-12 Coaches) October 27
 Pac-12 Offensive Player of the Week (Pac-12 Coaches) November 3
 Team's Most Outstanding Player (Skeie's Award)
 Team's Most Inspirational Player (Wilford Gonyea Award)†
 Pac-12 Offensive Player of the Year (Pac-12 Coaches)
 Pac-12 All-Conference 1st Team (Pac-12 Coaches)
 Pac-12 Championship Game MVP
 Johnny Unitas Golden Arm Award
 Polynesian College Football Player of the Year
 Davey O'Brien Award
 Walter Camp Award
 Walter Camp All-America Team
 Maxwell Award
 Heisman Trophy
 Associated Press Player of the Year
 Sports Illustrated Cover, December 29
 Rose Bowl Offensive MVP (January 1, 2015)
 Manning Award
 Unanimous All-American

†Shared award

College records

Pac-12 Conference
 Career total touchdowns, 135
 Single season total touchdowns, 58 (2014)
 Freshman passing touchdowns, 32 (2012)
 Passes attempted without an interception, 353 (2012–2013)

Oregon
 Career total offensive yards, 13,089 yards
 Career passing yards, 10,796
 Career passing touchdowns, 105 TD
 Single season passing yards, 4,454 yards (2014)
 Single season passing touchdowns, 42 (2014)
 Single game passing touchdowns, 6 TD (2012, at California)

Source: Oregon Ducks Football Media Guide

Conference records are also school records; once a conference record is recorded, its corresponding school record is removed. For example, the record for single-season total touchdowns is only recorded in the conference section, but it is both a conference record and University of Oregon record.

Professional career

Tennessee Titans
Mariota was selected with the second overall pick in the first round by the Tennessee Titans in the 2015 NFL Draft behind Jameis Winston.

2015 season: Rookie year

In May 2015, Mariota had the best-selling NFL jersey in the league, beating out Winston of the Tampa Bay Buccaneers, and Tom Brady of the New England Patriots, who had the second and third highest selling jerseys, respectively. "It's surreal for me, it's such an honor", Mariota said. "For me it's one of those deals, looking back on it in the future, it's a crazy, crazy deal for sure". Mariota and the Titans agreed to a contract on July 21, 2015. This made Mariota the last first-round pick to be signed and for the second straight year, the Titans were the last team to sign their first-round pick. Mariota signed a four-year, $24,213,974 contract with the Tennessee Titans. This includes a $15.9 million signing bonus, $24.2 million guaranteed. 

Mariota played his first career regular-season game on September 13 against 2015's first overall draft pick Jameis Winston and the Tampa Bay Buccaneers. On his fourth career pass attempt, Mariota threw his first NFL touchdown on a 52-yard throw to wide receiver Kendall Wright. Two plays later, Winston threw his first career pass on the next drive, and it was intercepted by cornerback Coty Sensabaugh and returned 26 yards for a touchdown. Mariota finished the game having thrown only two incompletions for 209 yards and four touchdowns in the 42–14 road victory. In the game, Mariota also gained a perfect passer rating of 158.3, making him the first quarterback in NFL history to attain a perfect passer rating in his first career start. Mariota became the first quarterback in NFL history to throw four touchdown passes in the first half of his NFL debut. He is also the youngest quarterback to reach the perfect passer rating (21 years, 318 days), surpassing Robert Griffin III. Because of this, Mariota was named AFC Offensive Player of the Week for Week 1.

In Week 2 against 2012 Heisman Trophy winner Johnny Manziel and the Cleveland Browns, Mariota completed 21 of his 37 passes for 257 yards and two touchdowns in the 28–14 loss.

In Week 3, Mariota played his first regular season home game against the Indianapolis Colts, Mariota completed 27 out of 44 passes for 367 yards with two touchdowns and two interceptions in the 35–33 loss. Mariota became the youngest quarterback since the franchise moved to Tennessee to throw for over 300 yards in a game. He shares an NFL record with Mark Rypien for touchdown passes in his first three games with eight.

On November 8, Mariota picked up his second career win and his first fourth-quarter/overtime comeback in a 34–28 overtime win over the New Orleans Saints, a game in which he threw for a career-high 371 yards and four touchdowns. He also became the first rookie quarterback in NFL history to have two games with four touchdowns and no interceptions and was named AFC Offensive Player of the Week for his performance against the Saints.

In Week 13, against the Jacksonville Jaguars, Mariota went 20-of-29, throwing for 268 yards with three touchdowns and one interception. He also ran for 112 yards on the day, including an 87-yard run for a touchdown. The Titans won the game by a score of 42–39.

In Week 14, in the third quarter, running back Antonio Andrews threw a 41-yard passing touchdown to Mariota in the wildcat formation. Mariota became the first quarterback in franchise history to catch a touchdown reception. He also became the first NFL player since Walter Payton in the 1983 season to pass for a touchdown, rush for a touchdown and catch a touchdown pass of at least 40 yards.

In Week 15, Mariota completed 3-of-6 passes for 32 yards against the New England Patriots before leaving the game in the second quarter with a knee injury. The next day, it was revealed that Mariota was diagnosed with another MCL sprain, and the Titans announced that he would miss the remainder of the season. Zach Mettenberger played in his place to close out the season. In 12 games of his rookie year in 2015, Mariota had 2,818 passing yards with 19 touchdowns and 10 interceptions. In addition, he rushed for 252 yards with two rushing touchdowns.

2016 season

On November 13, 2016, Mariota threw for 4 touchdowns and 295 yards as the Titans beat the Green Bay Packers by a score of 47–25. For his performance against the Packers, he was named AFC Offensive Player of the Week. Additionally, he was named the AFC Offensive Player of the Month for November after passing for 1,124 yards with 11 touchdowns and just two interceptions for a 115.0 passer rating, in addition to rushing for 89 yards and a touchdown. Unfortunately, Mariota fractured his right fibula in Week 16 in a 38–17 Christmas Eve loss to the Jacksonville Jaguars. He underwent surgery and was out for the final game of the season. Without Mariota, the Titans finished 9–7 and missed out on the playoffs for the eighth consecutive year.

Mariota finished the 2016 season with a career-high 3,426 passing yards with 26 touchdowns and nine interceptions. Additionally, he rushed for two touchdowns and a career-high 349 rushing yards. He was also ranked 50th by his peers on the NFL Top 100 Players of 2017 and was named a Pro Bowl first alternate.

2017 season

On September 10, 2017, against the Oakland Raiders in the season opener, Mariota recorded a rushing touchdown in the first quarter for the Titans' first points of the 2017 season. He finished the game 25-of-41 for 256 yards and totaled three rushes for 26 yards and a touchdown in the 26–16 defeat.

During Week 4 against the Houston Texans, Mariota was limited to 96 passing yards and 39 rushing yards. He rushed for 2 touchdowns before leaving the 57–14 defeat with a hamstring injury. He missed Week 5 against the Miami Dolphins, but he returned in Week 6 against the Colts and led the Titans to a 36–22 victory. In Week 17, with a playoff berth on the line, Mariota and the Titans had to beat the AFC South Champion—the Jaguars, in which they already beat in Week 2 by a score of 37–16. Mariota successfully completed that game to win 15–10, and to lock up the No. 5 seed in the playoffs after Baltimore lost to Cincinnati later that day. The win also locked up Tennessee's first postseason berth since 2008.

Mariota finished the regular season with 3,232 passing yards, 13 passing touchdowns, 15 interceptions, 312 rushing yards, and five rushing touchdowns.

Making his first postseason appearance in his career, Mariota and the Titans traveled to Kansas City to play the AFC West Champion—the Kansas City Chiefs, who they beat in 2016 off a game-winning field goal by placekicker and former Chief Ryan Succop. In the Wild Card Round, Mariota became only the second player in NFL history to catch his own pass for a touchdown after it was batted back to him by Darrelle Revis. Brad Johnson is the only other player to throw a touchdown pass to himself, although Mariota is the only quarterback to do so in the playoffs. The Titans went on to win 22–21 after being down 21–3 at halftime for their first playoff win since 2004. Mariota and the Titans had their season end in the Divisional Round against the New England Patriots. In the 35–14 loss, Mariota threw for 254 yards and two touchdowns and ran for 37 yards, but was sacked eight times.

2018 season

On April 18, 2018, the Titans picked up the fifth-year option on Mariota's contract.

In the season-opener against the Dolphins, Mariota was limited to 103 passing yards and 15 rushing yards before leaving the eventual 27–20 road loss with an elbow injury. He missed Week 2 against the Houston Texans due to his injury. During Week 3 against the Jaguars, Mariota came in to relieve Blaine Gabbert who suffered a concussion. Mariota completed 12 of 18 passes for 100 yards as the Titans won by a score of 9–6. Mariota returned to the starting lineup in Week 4 and completed 30 of 43 passes for 344 yards, two passing touchdowns, and an interception along with 46 rushing yards and a rushing touchdown. In that game, he led the Titans back from a 14-point deficit and an eventual 26–23 overtime win over the Philadelphia Eagles, earning him AFC Offensive Player of the Week. On October 14, 2018, Mariota was sacked 11 times against the Ravens in a 21–0 loss. On November 5, 2018, Mariota made his second appearance on Monday Night Football and won against the Dallas Cowboys by a score of 28–14, throwing for 240 yards and two touchdowns while also rushing for 32 yards and a touchdown to improve to 2–0 as a starter on Monday Night Football. On November 11, 2018, Mariota helped the Titans win against the Patriots 34–10, marking the first time the Titans beat the Patriots since 2002. He threw for 228 yards and two touchdowns. Additionally, he rushed for 21 yards and caught a pass for 21 yards. In a 34–17 Week 12 loss to the Texans, Mariota completed his first 19 passes as well as throwing for 303 yards and two touchdowns. He finished the game completing 22–23 passes for a completion percentage of 95.7. During Week 16 against the Washington Redskins, Mariota was limited to 110 passing yards and seven rushing yards before leaving the eventual 25–16 victory with a stinger. Without Mariota, the Titans, led by Gabbert, lost to the Colts in a play-in Week 17 contest, and they finished 9–7 for the third consecutive year and missed out on the playoffs.

Mariota finished the 2018 season with a career-low 11 touchdowns, 8 interceptions, and a career-low 2,528 passing yards. However, he rushed for a career-high 357 rushing yards and two rushing touchdowns.

2019 season

In the season-opener against the Cleveland Browns, Mariota threw for 248 yards and three touchdowns as the Titans won by a score of 43–13. During Week 4 against the Atlanta Falcons, he threw for 227 yards and three touchdowns in the 24–10 road victory. During a 16–0 Week 6 road loss to the Denver Broncos, Mariota was benched in the third quarter in favor of Ryan Tannehill with the Titans trailing 13–0 after he threw for 63 yards and two interceptions. The following week against the Los Angeles Chargers, Tannehill was named the starter, with Mariota serving as the backup. He remained the backup for the rest of the season. In the regular-season finale, a 35–14 road victory over the Texans, Mariota came in to throw a single pass. The 24-yard connection to rookie A. J. Brown put Brown over 1,000 receiving yards on the season.

In the Wild Card Round against the New England Patriots, Mariota completed a four-yard pass to MyCole Pruitt during the first quarter of the 20–13 road victory. Two weeks later in the AFC Championship against the Kansas City Chiefs, he came in during the second quarter and had a five-yard rush. The Titans went on to lose on the road by a score of 35–24.

In the offseason, prior to the start of free agency, the Titans signed Tannehill to a long-term extension, signaling the end of Mariota's five-year tenure in Tennessee.

Las Vegas Raiders
On March 25, 2020, Mariota signed a two-year, $17.6 million contract with the Las Vegas Raiders.

2020 season

Mariota was placed on injured reserve on September 7, 2020. Mariota was designated to return from injured reserve on September 30, and began practicing with the team again. He was activated on October 20.

Mariota made his Raiders debut in the first quarter of a Week 15 matchup against the Los Angeles Chargers after starter Derek Carr left the game with a groin injury. Mariota completed 17 of 28 passes for 226 yards, a touchdown, and an interception and rushed for 88 yards and a touchdown as the Raiders lost 30–27 in overtime.

2021 season

Mariota entered the season as the backup to Derek Carr. After being brought in for a designed play during the season-opener, Mariota suffered a quad injury and was placed on injured reserve on September 18, 2021. He was activated on October 16.

Throughout the season, Mariota was used frequently as a gadget quarterback and commonly entered games to run or hand off the football.

Atlanta Falcons
On March 21, 2022, Mariota signed a two-year, $18.75 million deal with the Atlanta Falcons.

2022 season

On July 28, 2022, Mariota was named the Falcons' starting quarterback after engaging in an open competition for the starting quarterback job with rookie Desmond Ridder during the offseason. Mariota threw for 215 yards, rushed for 72 yards and a rushing touchdown in the Falcons season opener, in a 27–26 loss to rival New Orleans Saints. In Week 6, Mariota went 13-for-14 for 129 yards and two touchdowns along with 50 rushing yards and a touchdown in a 28–14 win over the San Francisco 49ers, earning NFC Offensive Player of the Week. In Week 8 against the Carolina Panthers, Mariota passed 20 completions of 28 attempts for 253 yards with three touchdown passes and two interceptions in 37–34 win.

On December 8, 2022, Mariota was benched in favor of Ridder for the Falcons Week 15 game against the New Orleans Saints. Mariota was placed on injured reserve with a knee injury on December 14, 2022. On February 28, 2023, the Falcons released Mariota.

NFL career statistics

Regular season

Postseason

NFL records

 Most passing touchdowns by a rookie quarterback in one half: four (tied with Jameis Winston and Deshaun Watson) (September 13, 2015)
 First player in NFL history to pass for at least 250 yards with three touchdowns and rush for more than 100 yards in the same game
 Second rookie in NFL history to throw at least four touchdown passes in a season opener
 First quarterback in NFL history to record six total touchdown passes within the first two games of his career
 First player in the Super Bowl era with a perfect passer rating in first NFL start
 First player to have both a receiving and passing touchdown in a playoff game
 First player to throw a touchdown pass to himself in the playoffs
 Sixteen games with at least two touchdown passes in his first two NFL seasons (tied with Peyton Manning and Russell Wilson)
 First rookie to have two games with four touchdown passes and no interceptions
 First quarterback in NFL history to throw four touchdown passes in the first half of his NFL debut

Titans franchise records
 Most passing touchdowns in a season by a rookie: 19
 Most rushing yards in a game by a quarterback: 112
 Longest run by a quarterback: 87 yards
 First quarterback to catch a touchdown reception
 First player to throw a touchdown pass to himself
 First rookie to start at quarterback in Week 1
 Highest season completion percentage by a rookie (62.2)
 Highest single game completion percentage (95.7)
 Most Completions (game, as a rookie): 28 (November 8, 2015 against the New Orleans Saints) 
 Most Passing Yards (game, as a rookie): 371 (November 8, 2015 against the New Orleans Saints)
 Most Passing TDs (game, as a rookie): 4 (September 13, 2015 against the Tampa Bay Buccaneers and November 8, 2015 against the New Orleans Saints)
 Best Passer Rating (game, as a rookie): 158.3 (September 13, 2015 against the Tampa Bay Buccaneers)
 Most Yds/Pass Att (game, as a rookie): 13.93 (September 13, 2015 against the Tampa Bay Buccaneers)

Personal life
Mariota's wife gave birth to their first child on December 13, 2022. Mariota was recorded on-and-off the field during the 2022 NFL season for a Netflix and NFL Films documentary series, Quarterback, which will debut in the middle of 2023.

See also
 List of NCAA major college football yearly passing leaders
 List of NCAA major college football yearly total offense leaders
 List of Tennessee Titans first-round draft picks

References

External links

 Atlanta Falcons profile
 Oregon Ducks profile
 
 

1993 births
Living people
All-American college football players
American football quarterbacks
American people of German descent
American sportspeople of Samoan descent
Atlanta Falcons players
Christians from Hawaii
Heisman Trophy winners
Las Vegas Raiders players
Maxwell Award winners
Oregon Ducks football players
Players of American football from Honolulu
Saint Louis School alumni
Tennessee Titans players